Major General Sir John Raynsford Longley  (7 March 1867 – 13 February 1953) was a British Army officer who reached high command during World War I.

Military career
Educated at Cheltenham College, Longley was commissioned into the East Surrey Regiment in 1887 and served in South Africa in 1902, towards the end of the Second Boer War. In 1911 he was appointed Commanding Officer of 1st East Surreys and went to France in August 1914 at the start of World War I, fighting in the battles of Mons, Le Cateau, the Marne, the Aisne, La Bassée and Armentières. In early 1915 he was appointed Commander of 82nd Infantry Brigade and in December 1915, with the rank of Major General, he became the General Officer Commanding 10th (Irish) Division. 
He retained command of this division until 1919, serving in Salonika, before moving to Egypt in September 1917 where the division was part of XX Corps in its advance into Palestine. In 1919 Longley became General Officer Commanding 44th (Home Counties) Division before retiring in 1923.

From 1920 to 1939 Longley held the colonelcy of the East Surrey Regiment. Recalled at the start of the Second World War in 1939, he was re-employed as a Brigadier in the Dover Garrison. He died on 13 February 1953. The East Surrey Regimental chapel in All Saints Church, Kingston upon Thames, Surrey, has a memorial plaque to Longley and a stained glass window to the memory of both Longley and his son, killed in 1916 at the Battle of Jutland.

Honours and awards

References

 

|-

1867 births
1953 deaths
British Army generals of World War I
East Surrey Regiment officers
Knights Commander of the Order of St Michael and St George
Companions of the Order of the Bath
British Army personnel of the Second Boer War
People educated at Cheltenham College
Commanders of the Order of Saints Maurice and Lazarus
British Army major generals
British Army brigadiers of World War II